My Madonna is a lost 1915 American silent drama film directed by Alice Guy and starring Olga Petrova.

Cast
Olga Petrova - Lucille
Guy Coombs - Robert
Evelyn Dumo - The Baroness
Albert Howson - The Baron
James O'Neill - The Art Merchant
Albert Derbil
Yahne Fleury -

References

External links

Lobby poster

1915 films
Lost American films
Films directed by Alice Guy-Blaché
1915 drama films
Silent American drama films
American black-and-white films
Films based on works by Robert W. Service
Films based on poems
American silent feature films
Metro Pictures films
1915 lost films
Lost drama films
1910s American films